ASCAMP is a sub-orbital sounding rocket that was built in 1956 by the Cooper Development Company. There were a total of 27 launches, all taking place in 1958, with 1 failure.

References

Sounding rockets of the United States